Tara McGowan (born ) is an American political strategist and journalist. She was the co-founder and CEO of multiple organizations which have been noted for large expenditures on digital advertising in preparation for the 2020 United States presidential election, including the political organization Acronym, the company Lockwood Strategy, and the media company Courier Newsroom. She was the director of the advertising branch of Priorities USA Action, which was the primary super PAC supporting Hillary Clinton's 2016 presidential campaign, and was a digital producer for the re-election campaign of Barack Obama. Previously, she was the press secretary for United States Senator Jack Reed. In 2021, she stepped down from Acronym to build media full-time as head of a new company, Good Information Inc.

Journalism
McGowan began her career as a journalist, working on the CBS program 60 Minutes. After covering the Barack Obama 2008 presidential campaign, she left journalism to become the press secretary for Jack Reed, a United States Senator from Rhode Island. During the 2012 United States presidential election, McGowan was a digital producer for Barack Obama's re-election campaign.

In 2016, McGowan directed the $42 million digital advertising branch of Priorities USA Action, the primary super PAC supporting Hillary Clinton's 2016 presidential campaign. It was the largest ever ad campaign by the PAC.

Digital advertising
In 2017, McGowan launched the political strategy firm Lockwood Strategy, which Campaigns and Elections magazine identified as a crucial force in Democratic Party victories in the 2017 Virginia elections.

Shortly after founding Lockwood Strategy, McGowan co-founded the digital advertising organisation Acronym together with Michael Dubin and with Laurene Powell Jobs and Reid Hoffman's financial backing.  Within just over a year, Acronym had raised tens of millions of dollars for digital advertising campaigns, running more than 100 ad campaigns and registering 60,000 voters.

One of McGowan's projects, called Courier Newsroom, is a for-profit media company that produces digital newspapers in Arizona, Michigan, North Carolina, Pennsylvania, Virginia, and Wisconsin, with the aim of filling news deserts in swing states by providing regional news coverage from a left-wing perspective. McGowan's goal of creating a partisan online newsroom is partly intended to combat online fake news, which led The New Yorker to label McGowan "a starry-eyed techno-utopian" for her stated belief that digital information is the most effective way to combat digital misinformation.

McGowan has been credited with significant innovations in digital political strategy, and has often been described as one of the few progressive strategists to focus specifically on digital media. Joshua Green, writing for Bloomberg News, wrote that McGowan has "gained notoriety for her outspoken criticism of her party's inability to challenge, or even clearly comprehend, Trump's dominance of the digital landscape". Similarly, Ozy magazine called her "The Democrats' most dangerous digital strategist", with Nick Fouriezos writing that her efforts "will be one of the major forces shaping the Democrats' general-election fight against Donald Trump", and Politico referred to her as "one of the Democratic Party's most in-demand leaders this cycle". McGowan has also received awards for her work on digital campaigns: she was recognized as a 2018 Rising Star by Campaigns and Elections magazine, and was listed as a "Name to know" by Politico.

Her work on digital advertising is regularly cited in publications like The New York Times, The Atlantic, and Axios, and her views on digital strategy are frequently quoted in news stories regarding digital advertising campaigns by outlets like The Washington Post, NBC News, and The Hill.

Personal life
McGowan is married to Michael Halle, a political consultant who has worked as a lead organizer in Iowa for Hillary Clinton and as a senior strategist for Pete Buttigieg.  In the 2020 election cycle, McGowan supported Pete Buttigieg and opposed Bernie Sanders.

Awards
Rising Star, Campaigns and Elections magazine (2018)
Name to know, Politico (2020)

References

External links

1980s births
Living people
American women in politics
American nonprofit chief executives
American women chief executives
Year of birth uncertain
21st-century American women